Zabur-i-Ajam (Persian Psalms) is a philosophical poetry book, written in Persian, of Allama Iqbal, the great poet-philosopher of the Indian subcontinent. It was published in 1927.

Introduction 

Zabur-i Ajam includes the mathnavi Gulshan-i Raz-i Jadid and Bandagi Nama. There are four sections. The first two are sequences of ghazals in the classical form and the other two are single long poems. Iqbal forcefully expresses his inner convictions and urges the reader to advance himself to achieve progress and prosperity by discovering and strengthening the self.

The first of the two longer poems is the Gulshan-i Raz-i Jadid ("New Garden of Mysteries"). It alludes to the Gulshan-i Raz, the treatise on Sufism written in Persian verse by Sa'd ad-Din Mahmud Shabistari. Here Iqbal poses and answers nine questions on philosophical problems such as the nature of discursive thought, of the self, and of the relation between the eternal and the temporal.

The subject of the second poem, the Bandagi Nama ("Book of Servitude") is the loss of freedom, particularly spiritual freedom, of an individual or society, and its consequent evils. It is divided into several sections and touches on the music and other arts of enslaved people, their religious tenets and the art of reconstructing free men.

In Zabur-i Ajam, Iqbal's Persian ghazal is at its best as his Urdu ghazal is in Bal-i Jibril. Here as in other books, Iqbal insists on remembering the past, doing well in the present and preparing for the future. His lesson is that one should be dynamic, full of zest for action and full of love and life. Implicitly, he proves that there is no form of poetry which can equal the ghazal in vigour and liveliness.

See also 
 Index of Muhammad Iqbal–related articles
 Payam-i-Mashriq
 Javid Nama
 Pas Chih Bayad Kard ay Aqwam-i-Sharq
 Bang-e-Dara
 Bal-e-Jibril
 Asrar-i-Khudi
 Rumuz-e-Bekhudi
 Zarb-i-Kalim
 Armaghan-i-Hijaz
 Zabur
 Ajam

External links 
Read Online at Iqbal Academy site
Read Online at Iqbal cyber library
Read English translation by Arthur J. Arberry & Bashir Ahmad Dar at Iqbal Academy site

1927 books
Persian poems
Islamic philosophical poetry books
Poetry by Muhammad Iqbal
Poetry collections